Repuru is a village in Pedapudi mandal in East Godavari district, Andhra Pradesh state, India.

References

Villages in East Godavari district